Microfibrillar-associated protein 2 is a protein that in humans is encoded by the MFAP2 gene.

Microfibrillar-associated protein 2 is a major antigen of elastin-associated microfibrils and a candidate for involvement in the etiology of inherited connective tissue diseases. This gene encodes two transcripts with two alternatively spliced 5' untranslated exons. These two transcripts contain the same eight coding exons, and therefore, encode the same protein.

References

Further reading